A.E. (sometimes shown unpunctuated as AE) is a fixed shooter written by Jun Wada and Makoto Horai for the Apple II and Atari 8-bit family and published by Broderbund in 1982. Versions for the VIC-20 (1983) and MSX (1984) followed. Unlike most earlier shooters which have a solid color or starfield as a background, the action in A.E. takes place in front of science fiction scenes. Attacking creatures emerge from points in the image, often appearing to come from behind objects. Combined with a slight scaling as they advance, there is the impression of depth.

According to the back of the box, "A.E. is the Japanese word for 'ray' as in Manta Ray or Sting Ray", robotic versions of which are enemies in the game.

Gameplay
The player's ship can be moved left and right along the bottom of the screen. The fire button launches a missile upward which detonates when the button is released.

Development
Broderbund partnered with Japanese developer Programmers-3 for several games, and A.E. was the first of these. According to Broderbund  co-founder Doug Carlston, the Atari 8-bit version of A.E. was the first Atari computer game written in Japan.

Reception
Arnie Katz wrote for Arcade Express: "The swirling flightpaths of the attackers as they zoom hither and yon around the eight playscreens is the principal feature that distinguishes 'A.E.' from the usual run of invasion games." He pointed out that the images the game is played over have little bearing on gameplay. Citing a satisfying difficulty balance, Katz concluded with a score of 8/10.

Computer Games magazine gave the Atari and Apple versions an "A" in its "1985 Software Buyers Guide." Writing for Videogaming and Computer Gaming Illustrated, Susan Levitan concluded: "A.E. is a highly recommended, very challenging and rewarding game. The 3-D graphics are stunning and the serpentine movement of the A.E. is mesmerizing."

References

External links
A.E. at Atari Mania
A.E. at MSX Games World
Review in Softline
Review in Computers & Electronics
Review in Creative Computing
Review in Softalk
Review in SoftSide

1982 video games
Apple II games
Atari 8-bit family games
Broderbund games
VIC-20 games
Fixed shooters
MSX games
Video games developed in Japan